The Essential is a compilation album by English recording artist Will Young. Completing his contract with his record company, it was released by 19 Recordings in association with RCA Records and Sony Music on 14 October 2013, marking Young's final release with the label.

Track listing

Charts

Certifications

References

2013 greatest hits albums
Will Young albums
19 Recordings compilation albums
Albums produced by Richard Stannard (songwriter)
Albums produced by Mike Peden